Mário Grman (born 11 April 1997) is a Slovak professional ice hockey defenceman currently playing for SaiPa in the Liiga.

Career statistics

International

References

External links

1997 births
Living people
Slovak ice hockey defencemen
Red Deer Rebels players
Kootenay Ice players
MsHK Žilina players
Piráti Chomutov players
HC Slovan Bratislava players
SaiPa players
Sportspeople from Topoľčany
Ice hockey players at the 2022 Winter Olympics
Olympic ice hockey players of Slovakia
Slovak expatriate ice hockey players in Canada
Slovak expatriate ice hockey players in the Czech Republic
Slovak expatriate ice hockey players in Finland